Cryptanthus minarum is a plant species in the genus Cryptanthus. This species is endemic to Brazil.

References

minarum
Flora of Brazil